Au Pair is a 1999 American made-for-television romantic comedy film starring Gregory Harrison and Heidi Noelle Lenhart. The film is the first in the Au Pair trilogy.

Plot
Jennifer "Jenny" Morgan (Heidi Noelle Lenhart) is a young and intelligent working-class woman who just graduated from UCLA with an MBA. She is engaged to Charlie, a feckless man who intends to spend his summer traveling around Europe. After a job offer falls through, she finds herself searching and responds to a promising job ad for Oliver Caldwell's (Gregory Harrison) company, Caldwell Corporation International (CCI). She gets an interview and is led to believe that it is a copy room position, which she decides to move forward with, thinking it would be a foot into the company. Jenny gets the job and is surprised and overwhelmed when a car and its chauffeur show up at her door, telling her to pack and that she is to leave for Paris in a couple of hours. Through a series of errors, Jenny is baffled to discover that she was hired to be the au pair for Oliver's two children, Katie (Katie Volding) and Alex (Jake Dinwiddie).

Cast
 Heidi Lenhart as Jennifer 'Jenny' Morgan
 Gregory Harrison as Oliver Caldwell
 Jane Sibbett as Vivian Berger
 Katie Volding as Katie Caldwell
 Jake Dinwiddie as Alex Caldwell
 John Rhys-Davies as Nigel Kent
 Richard Riehle as Sam Morgan
 Michael Woolson as Charlie Cruikshank
 Larry Robbins as Ernie
 Pat Elliott as Sutton Parks Employee
 Dávid Ungvári as Receptionist
 Kristin Hansen as Matronly Woman
 Éva Gyetvai as Secretary
 Peter Linka as L.A. Chauffeur
 Caitlin Griffiths as Girl on Plane

Release 
The film was originally released in 1999. It has had the most viewers in the network's TV Movie history. The film has been released on Region 4 DVD.

References

External links 
 
 
 

1999 romantic comedy films
ABC Family original films
1999 television films
1999 films
Films scored by Inon Zur
Saban Entertainment films
Au pairs in films
American romantic comedy films
1990s English-language films
Films directed by Mark Griffiths (director)
1990s American films